Greg P. Russell is an American sound engineer. He has worked on more than 200 films since 1970, and has received 16 Academy Award nominations for Best Sound Mixing, although he has never won. Greg has also been nominated for 11 Cinema Audio Society awards, two BAFTA's and two Emmys, with one Daytime Emmy Award win occurring in 1989 for Outstanding Film Sound Mixing for his work on Muppet Babies.

Selected filmography

 Black Rain (1989)
 The Rock (1996)
 Con Air (1997)
 The Mask of Zorro (1998)
 Armageddon (1998)
 The Patriot (2000)
 Pearl Harbor (2001)
 Spider-Man (2002)
 Spider-Man 2 (2004)
 Memoirs of a Geisha (2005)
 Apocalypto (2006)
 Transformers (2007)
 Transformers: Revenge of the Fallen (2009)
 Salt (2010)
 Transformers: Dark of the Moon (2011)
 Skyfall (2012)

Notes

References

External links

Year of birth missing (living people)
Living people
American audio engineers
Daytime Emmy Award winners